Louis Herbert Gray, Ph.D. (1875–1955) was an American Orientalist, born at Newark, New Jersey. He graduated from Princeton University in 1896 and from Columbia University (Ph.D., 1900).

Gray contributed to the annals of the New York Academy of Sciences, with contributions on such topics as the Avestan texts. He served as American collaborator on the Orientalische Bibliographie in 1900-1906; revised translations for The Jewish Encyclopedia in 1904-1905; was associate editor of the Hastings Encyclopædia of Religion and Ethics (Edinburgh, 1905–15); editor of Mythology of all Races (1915–18); translated Subandhu's Vasavadatta (1913); and afterwards (1921) served as professor at the University of Nebraska. His 1902 work Indo-Iranian Phonology was published as the second volume of the 13 volume Columbia University Indo-Iranian Series, published by the Columbia University Press, in between 1901–32 and edited by A. V. Williams Jackson.

He was one of the American commissioners to negotiate peace in Paris (1918) and attaché to the American embassy.

Works
 
 
 Gray, Louis H. (1939). Foundations of Language. New York: Macmillan.

References

External links

 "Louis H. Gray" Works by Louis Herbert Gray at JSTOR
 

1875 births
1955 deaths
American lexicographers
Linguists from the United States
Columbia University alumni
People from Newark, New Jersey
Princeton University alumni
Linguistic Society of America presidents
Sanskrit–English translators